HMAS Stawell (J348/M348) was a  named for the town of Stawell, Victoria. Sixty Bathurst-class corvettes were constructed during World War II, and Stawell was one of 36 initially manned and commissioned solely by the Royal Australian Navy (RAN).

The corvette later served in the Royal New Zealand Navy (RNZN) as HMNZS Stawell.

Design and construction

In 1938, the Australian Commonwealth Naval Board (ACNB) identified the need for a general purpose 'local defence vessel' capable of both anti-submarine and mine-warfare duties, while easy to construct and operate. Construction of the prototype  did not go ahead, but the plans were retained. The need for locally built 'all-rounder' vessels at the start of World War II saw the "Australian Minesweepers" (designated as such to hide their anti-submarine capability, but popularly referred to as "corvettes") approved in September 1939, with 60 constructed during the course of the war: 36 (including Stawell) ordered by the RAN, 20 ordered by the British Admiralty but manned and commissioned as RAN vessels, and 4 for the Royal Indian Navy.

Stawell was laid down by HMA Naval Dockyard at Williamstown, Victoria on 18 June 1942. She was launched on 3 April 1943 by Mrs. J. J. Dedman, wife of the Minister for War Organisation, and commissioned into the RAN on 7 August 1943.

Operational history

RAN
The majority of Stawells career was spent in three areas. Initially, she served as a convoy escort along the east coast of Australia. Following this, Stawell participated in a variety of escort, minesweeping, and combat roles throughout New Guinea waters. On 3 August 1945 she sank an armed Daihatsu barge in the Moluccas area. In the final third of her career, the ship spent time in Hong Kong waters, performing minsweeping and anti-piracy duties. Stawell returned to Brisbane in November 1945.

The corvette received three battle honours for her wartime service: "Pacific 1943–45", "New Guinea 1943–44", and "Borneo 1945".

RNZN
Stawell was removed from RAN service on 26 March 1946.

She was commissioned into the RNZN during May 1952 and given the prefix HMNZS. Stawell operated primarily as a training vessel until 1959, when she was placed into reserve.

Fate
Stawell was sold to Pacific Scrap Limited of Auckland, New Zealand in July 1968, and was broken up for scrap.

Citations

References

Books

Journal and news articles

Bathurst-class corvettes of the Royal Australian Navy
Ships built in Victoria (Australia)
World War II corvettes of Australia
1943 ships
Bathurst-class corvettes of the Royal New Zealand Navy